Torremontalbo is a municipality in the province and autonomous community of La Rioja, Spain, situated at the foot of the N-232 road (Spain).

References

Populated places in La Rioja (Spain)